United States Army Forces Command (FORSCOM) is the largest United States Army command. It provides expeditionary, regionally engaged, campaign-capable land forces to combatant commanders. Headquartered at Fort Bragg, North Carolina, FORSCOM consists of more than 750,000 active Army, U.S. Army Reserve, and Army National Guard soldiers. FORSCOM was created on 1 July 1973 from the former Continental Army Command (CONARC), who in turn supplanted Army Field Forces and Army Ground Forces.

Mission and vision
The mission is: "Forces Command trains and prepares a combat ready, globally responsive Total Force in order to build and sustain readiness to meet Combatant Command requirements."

The vision is to: "[produce] combat ready and globally responsive Total Army Forces that are well led, disciplined, trained, and expeditionary…ready now to deploy and win in Large Scale Combat Operations against near-peer threats."

Overview
The Command is focused on the transformation of the Army into a more deployable and maneuverable lethal force. This shift to a modular force design increases the number of units available to support regional combatant commanders.
 
The capabilities of the new brigade-level formations – armor, infantry, airborne, air assault and Stryker – ensure greater flexibility and enhance FORSCOM's ability to deploy trained and ready forces quickly.

FORSCOM has major units located at 15 installations, including the National Training Center at Fort Irwin, California and the Joint Readiness Training Center at Fort Polk, Louisiana.

Following the recommendations of the 2005 Base Realignment and Closure Commission, the Command moved from Fort McPherson, Georgia to a new headquarters facility at Fort Bragg, North Carolina, in June 2011. The Command hosted a "Casing of the Colors" ceremony on 24 June 2011 at Fort McPherson, and an "Uncasing of Colors" on 1 Aug. 2011 at Fort Bragg.

Lineage
U.S. Army Ground Forces, 1942–1948
U.S. Army Field Forces, 1948–1955
Continental Army Command (CONARC), 1955–1973
U.S. Army Forces Command, 1973–1987
U.S. Forces Command (Specified Command), 1987–1993
U.S. Army Forces Command, 1993–present

Active component
During the Cold War, Forces Command supervised a number of armies each responsible for areas of the continental United States: First Army, Fourth Army, Fifth Army, and Sixth Army, at various times. Their responsibilities varied over time, but from the 1980s to the mid-1990s covered Reserve Component training supervision. FORSCOM currently commands U.S. Army Reserve Command, and First Army.

FORSCOM also commands three Army corps: III Armored Corps at Fort Hood, Texas; V Corps at Fort Knox, Kentucky; and XVIII Airborne Corps at Fort Bragg, North Carolina. Together the three corps include nine divisions, one cavalry regiment, 37 support brigades of various types, and a range of other corps combat, combat support and combat service support units.

First U.S. Army is responsible for training, mobilization and deployment support to Reserve Component and National Guard units in FORSCOM. They also execute FORSCOM missions within their geographic areas of responsibility.  First U.S. Army at Rock Island Army Arsenal, Ill., reports to FORSCOM.  It is responsible for the training, mobilization and deployment support for reserve component units in FORSCOM.  It executes missions within the continental United States and Puerto Rico.

United States Army Reserve
A major subordinate command is the United States Army Reserve Command (USARC), also headquartered in the same building as FORSCOM at Fort Bragg, N.C. It commands all United States Army Reserve units in the continental United States, except those assigned to Special Operations Command. The Army Reserve strength stands at about 179,000 soldiers.

Army National Guard
The Army National Guard provides Forces Command a balanced force of eight National Guard combat divisions, 15 brigades, and extensive combat support and combat service support units.

The current FORSCOM Army National Guard strength is approximately 351,000 soldiers. Mobilizing the Army National Guard into active federal service would bring the total strength of FORSCOM to nearly two-thirds of the Army's combat ground forces.

Subordinate units
 United States Army Reserve Command, Fort Bragg, NC
 First United States Army, Rock Island Arsenal, IL
First Army Division East, Fort Knox, KY
4th Cavalry Brigade, Fort Knox, KY
72nd Field Artillery Brigade, Fort Dix, NJ
87th Army Reserve Support Command, Horace B. Hanson United States Army Reserve Center, AL
157th Infantry Brigade, Camp Atterbury, IN
158th Infantry Brigade, Camp Shelby, MS
174th Infantry Brigade, Fort Drum, NY
177th Armored Brigade, Camp Shelby, MS
188th Infantry Brigade, Fort Stewart, GA
First Army Division West, Fort Hood, TX
5th Armored Brigade, Fort Bliss, TX
85th Army Reserve Support Command, COL Paul G. Schulstad United States Army Reserve Center, IL
120th Infantry Brigade, Fort Hood, TX
166th Aviation Brigade, Fort Hood, TX
181st Infantry Brigade, Fort McCoy, WI
189th Infantry Brigade, Fort Lewis, WA
402nd Field Artillery Brigade, Fort Bliss, TX
 III Armored Corps, Fort Hood, TX
 1st Infantry Division, Fort Riley, KS
1st Armored Brigade Combat Team
2nd Armored Brigade Combat Team
1st Infantry Division Artillery
Combat Aviation Brigade, 1st Infantry Division
1st Sustainment Brigade
 1st Cavalry Division, Fort Hood, TX
1st Armored Brigade Combat Team
2nd Armored Brigade Combat Team
3rd Armored Brigade Combat Team
1st Cavalry Division Artillery
Combat Aviation Brigade, 1st Cavalry Division
1st Cavalry Division Sustainment Brigade
 1st Armored Division, Fort Bliss, TX
1st Armored Brigade Combat Team
2nd Armored Brigade Combat Team
3rd Armored Brigade Combat Team
1st Armored Division Artillery
Combat Aviation Brigade, 1st Armored Division
15th Sustainment Brigade
 4th Infantry Division, Fort Carson, CO
1st Stryker Brigade Combat Team
2nd Stryker Brigade Combat Team
3rd Armored Brigade Combat Team
4th Infantry Division Artillery
Combat Aviation Brigade, 4th Infantry Division
43rd Sustainment Brigade
11th Signal Brigade, Fort Hood, TX
75th Field Artillery Brigade, Fort Sill, OK
36th Engineer Brigade, Fort Hood, TX
3rd Cavalry Regiment, Fort Hood, TX
504th Military Intelligence Brigade, Fort Hood, TX
89th Military Police Brigade, Fort Hood, TX
1st Medical Brigade, Fort Hood, TX
13th Sustainment Command, Fort Hood, TX
 V Corps (United States), Fort Knox, KY
 XVIII Airborne Corps, Fort Bragg, NC
 3rd Infantry Division, Fort Stewart, GA
1st Armored Brigade Combat Team
2nd Armored Brigade Combat Team
48th Infantry Brigade Combat Team (Georgia Army National Guard)
Task Force 1st Battalion, 28th Infantry Regiment, Fort Benning, GA
3rd Infantry Division Artillery
Combat Aviation Brigade, 3rd Infantry Division
3rd Sustainment Brigade
 10th Mountain Division, Fort Drum, NY
1st Infantry Brigade Combat Team
2nd Infantry Brigade Combat Team
3rd Infantry Brigade Combat Team, Fort Polk, LA
10th Mountain Division Artillery
Combat Aviation Brigade, 10th Mountain Division
10th Sustainment Brigade
 82nd Airborne Division, Fort Bragg, NC
1st Infantry Brigade Combat Team (Airborne)
2nd Infantry Brigade Combat Team (Airborne)
3rd Infantry Brigade Combat Team (Airborne)
82nd Airborne Division Artillery
Combat Aviation Brigade, 82nd Airborne Division
82nd Sustainment Brigade
 101st Airborne Division, Fort Campbell, KY
1st Infantry Brigade Combat Team (Air Assault)
2nd Infantry Brigade Combat Team (Air Assault)
3rd Infantry Brigade Combat Team (Air Assault)
101st Airborne Division Artillery
Combat Aviation Brigade, 101st Airborne Division
101st Sustainment Brigade
18th Field Artillery Brigade, Fort Bragg, NC
20th Engineer Brigade, Fort Bragg, NC
16th Military Police Brigade, Fort Bragg, NC
3rd Sustainment Command (Expeditionary), Fort Bragg, NC
7th Transportation Brigade, Fort Eustis, VA
525th Military Intelligence Brigade, Fort Bragg, NC
35th Signal Brigade, Fort Gordon, GA
44th Medical Brigade, Fort Bragg, NC
83rd Civil Affairs Battalion, Fort Bragg, NC
 Security Force Assistance Command, Fort Bragg, NC
1st Security Force Assistance Brigade, Fort Benning, GA
2nd Security Force Assistance Brigade, Fort Bragg, NC
3rd Security Force Assistance Brigade, Fort Hood, TX
4th Security Force Assistance Brigade, Fort Carson, CO
5th Security Force Assistance Brigade, Joint Base Lewis-McChord, WA
54th Security Force Assistance Brigade (National Guard) 
 20th Support Command (CBRNE), Aberdeen Proving Ground, MD
48th Chemical Brigade, Fort Hood, TX
52nd Ordnance Group (EOD), Fort Campbell, KY
71st Ordnance Group (EOD), Fort Carson, CO
 32nd Army Air & Missile Defense Command Fort Bliss, TX
11th Air Defense Artillery Brigade, Fort Bliss, TX
31st Air Defense Artillery Brigade, Fort Sill, OK
69th Air Defense Artillery Brigade, Fort Hood, TX
108th Air Defense Artillery Brigade, Fort Bragg, NC
 Air Traffic Services Command Fort Rucker, AL
 Fort Irwin National Training Center, CA
 Joint Readiness Training Center, Fort Polk, LA

See also
U.S. Armed Forces operations commands
 United States Fleet Forces Command
 United States Marine Corps Forces Command
 Air Combat Command
 Space Operations Command

References

External links

 U.S Army Forces Command Homepage

1973 establishments in the United States
Forces
Military units and formations established in 1973